Giải mã (Decode) is the debut studio album by Vietnamese singer-songwriter and record producer Vũ Cát Tường, released on December 23, 2014. The album includes 9 self-composed songs of Vũ Cát Tường, including new songs ( Phai, Niềm yêu khác, Anh và anh, Hẹn yêu, Chơ vơ, Hôn) and songs that were previously known ( Yêu xa, Vết mưa, Đông). The 9 songs in the album have written in Pop, Neo soul, R&B, Ballad ,... Musician Huy Tuấn is the main producer of the album.

The meaning of the name "Giải mã (Decode)" 
Vũ Cát Tường said: "My daily life revolves around programming problems, code writing, circuits and numbers. My original personality is so dry that a romantic name for the album is only a little difficult to think. If the nature of science is observation, research, and analysis, the way I feel about youthful love follows the same process. I am on my way of understanding my life, explaining the meetings and separation. So the album has no better name than "Giải mã (Decoding)"." 
The songs in this album were all composed by Vũ Cát Tường with her true nostalgia and emotions about life.

Track listing

References

Vũ Cát Tường albums
2014 debut albums